Little Smalltalk is a non-standard dialect and runtime system, a virtual machine referred to as "system", of the Smalltalk-80 programming language implemented by Timothy Budd at University of Arizona in 1984 along with a group of his students. It was originally described in a book "A Little Smalltalk" (1987), and was created as result of lack of cheap access to Smalltalk-80 runtime at the time; it was initially intended to run on Unix on a VAX-780. 

The Little Smalltalk system was the first Smalltalk interpreter produced outside of Xerox PARC. Although it lacked many of the features of the original Smalltalk-80 system, it helped popularize the ideas of object-oriented programming, virtual machines, and bytecode interpreters.

In 1994, Timothy Budd rewrote Little Smalltalk in Java, and distributes it as the SmallWorld system. Little Smalltalk source code wasn't touched since then.

The original releases are under a variety of licenses. They are now maintained by Danny Reinhold via the Little Smalltalk project. Recently work on a new major version has begun. This differs from earlier releases by providing support for graphical applications, a foreign function interface, and many integrated tools.

Goals 
Little Smalltalk is intended to:

 Closely resemble Smalltalk-80 description
 Run on Unix accessed by conventional terminals
 Run on 16-bit machines with separate instruction and data memory, on a small memory size
 Be written in C language

Syntax

Licenses, copyright 
 Version 1 – Must attribute original source and keep copyright notice in source files
 Version 2 – Public domain
 Version 3 – Public domain
 Version 4 – Free for non-commercial use
 Version 5 – Released under an MIT style license

References

External links 
 , archived
 SmallWorld
 "A Little Smalltalk" and other Smalltalk related books
 , 2007
 , all 5 versions, more up-to-date, with some fixes

Class-based programming languages
Dynamically typed programming languages
Smalltalk programming language family